Max was an Australian music channel formerly known as musicMAX prior to 14 March 2004, available on Foxtel, Austar and Optus Television. The distinctive MAX logo was designed by Australian designer director, Domenico Bartolo of 21–19.

In May 2020, it was announced that Foxtel would cease operations of Max at the end of June, as part of a deal with Network 10 owner ViacomCBS Networks UK & Australia. It was replaced with the relaunch of MTV Classic at 6AM on July 1; the last video on Max was "Too Good at Goodbyes" by Sam Smith.

Programming

Original programming

 Feel the Love (a range of clips requested and dedicated by viewers to their loved ones)
 Live Music (a local or international band performing live in the MAX studio every Sunday)
 Loving the '80s (a compilation of the greatest hits from the 1980s)
 Loving the '90s (a compilation of the greatest hits from the 1990s)
 Lunch with... & at Twilight... (an hour of the best clips from the chosen artist, plus interviews and behind-the-scenes snippets)
 MAX Escape Weekend (a countdown on various topics every weekend, such as Top 100 Aussie Songs or Top 100 Sexiest Men)
 MAX Top 50s (a countdown of the Top 50 of various topics, such as Top 50 Karaoke Songs or Top 50 Guitarists)
 My Top Eleven (local or international music guests choose their Top 11 video clips of all time)
 partyMAX (a compilation of the best party songs ever)
 The MAX Sessions (a live concert every week with only the best local or international artists, similar to MTV Unplugged)
 The Know (a weekly talk show featuring pop culture news)
 My First Gig (13 April 2009 – present): a 10-part series hosted by Jimmy Barnes

Other programs
 Later with Jools (Jools Holland hosts his own music variety show; not produced by MAX)
 1000 Top Non-Stop Hits (a special event featuring 1000 songs, includes advertisements)

Current programs
 Same Title, Different Song (songs with same title, but totally different in sounders)
 Party MAX (non-stop music throughout the night)
 Wake Up with MAX (hottest tunes to wake up to every morning)
 MAX by Requests (videos as picked by viewers)
 MAX Superstar (music videos produced by a chosen artist only)

References

External links
Official site

Music video networks in Australia
English-language television stations in Australia
Defunct television channels in Australia
Television channels and stations established in 2000
2000 establishments in Australia
Television channels and stations disestablished in 2020
2020 disestablishments in Australia
Foxtel